This article lists the largest companies in Taiwan in terms of their revenue, net profit and total assets, according to the American business magazines Fortune and Forbes.

2020 Fortune list 
This list displays all 9 Taiwanese companies in the Fortune Global 500, which ranks the world's largest companies by annual revenue. The figures below are given in millions of US dollars and are for the fiscal year 2019. Also listed are the headquarters location, net profit, number of employees worldwide and industry sector of each company.

2021 Forbes list 

This list is based on the Forbes Global 2000, which ranks the world's 2,000 largest publicly traded companies. The Forbes list takes into account a multitude of factors, including the revenue, net profit, total assets and market value of each company; each factor is given a weighted rank in terms of importance when considering the overall ranking. The table below also lists the headquarters location and industry sector of each company. The figures are in billions of US dollars and are for the year 2020. All 43 companies from Taiwan in the Forbes 2000 are listed.

See also 

Economy of Taiwan
List of companies of Taiwan
 List of largest companies by revenue

References 

Taiwan

companies